Taman Universiti is a suburb in Iskandar Puteri, Johor Bahru District, Johor, Malaysia.

Universiti Teknologi Malaysia (UTM) is a 5-minute drive away from Taman Universiti, hence the name of the town. The town is dominated by civil servants (lecturers, office workers) and students from UTM. The university alone has 30,000 students who mostly live on campus but visit the town to shop.

Naming of area and roads 
The town is divided into 10 areas; Pertanian (meaning agriculture), Penyiaran (broadcasting), Perubatan (medical), Perdagangan (trade), Kebangsaan (national), Kejayaan (success), Kebudayaan (culture), Kemajuan (progress), Kemuliaan (honour), and Pendidikan (education). The word Jalan (street) is added in front of the area name and a number is added after the area name to complete the road system. For example, Jalan Kebangsaan 23. It was named so that all the areas that begin with the letter P are on the West side of the Jalan Pendidikan that is the main road running through Taman Universiti and areas that begin with the letter K on the east side of Jalan Pendidikan.

From this system, the heart of Taman Universiti is located at Kebangsaan zone where Aeon Taman Universiti (as known as JUSCO) and most shops are located.

Shop 
The first shops opened were two story shop lots. On the 31st of July 2002, JUSCO opened its store in Taman Universiti. This is JUSCO's ninth store in Malaysia and the first in Johor. It has a lettable area of  including 53,000 square feet (5,000 m²) of tenant space. It offers not only shopping but also a place for fun and fine dining for the family.

Education 
List of primary schools:
 Sekolah Rendah Kebangsaan Taman Universiti 1
 Sekolah Rendah Kebangsaan Taman Universiti 2
 Sekolah Rendah Kebangsaan Taman Universiti 3
 Sekolah Rendah Kebangsaan Taman Universiti 4

List of secondary schools:
 Sekolah Menengah Kebangsaan Taman Universiti
 Sekolah Menengah Kebangsaan Taman Universiti 2

List of university:
 Universiti Teknologi Malaysia

Facilities 
 Post Office
 Sports & Recreational Club
 Multi-purpose Hall
 Children's Library
 Government Clinic
 Library
 Fire Station
 Wet Market

Places of Worship 
 Tan Sri Ainuddin Wahid Mosque
 Taman Universiti Guan Ti Temple (大学城关帝庙)
 Er Lang Sern Temple (大学城二郎神庙)
 Xian Fo Gong Temple (大学城仙佛宫)
 Sri Maha Mariamman Temple (ஸ்ரீ மஹா மாரியம்மன் ஆலயம்)

Transportation
The area houses the Taman Universiti bus terminal. It is accessible by Muafakat Bus route P-202. or Causeway Link (5B, 51B) from Johor Bahru Sentral railway station.

References

Iskandar Puteri
Towns in Johor
Towns and suburbs in Johor Bahru District